Table tennis events have been contested at every Asian Para Games since 2010 Asian Games in Guangzhou.

Editions

Medal table

See also 
 Table tennis at the Summer Paralympics
 Table tennis at the Asian Games

References

External links 
Asian Paralympic Committee

 
Sports at the Asian Para Games
Table tennis at multi-sport events